Macrophyes is a genus of anyphaenid sac spiders first described by O. Pickard-Cambridge in 1893.

Species
 it contains eight species:
Macrophyes attenuata O. Pickard-Cambridge, 1893 – Mexico
Macrophyes ceratii Martínez, Brescovit & Oliveira, 2020 – Colombia
Macrophyes elongata Chickering, 1937 – Costa Rica, Panama
Macrophyes jundiai Brescovit, 1993 – Brazil, Argentina
Macrophyes manati Brescovit, 1993 – Peru
Macrophyes pacoti Brescovit, Oliveira, J. C. M. S. M. Sobczak & J. B. Sobczak, 2019 – Brazil
Macrophyes sanzi Martínez, Brescovit & Oliveira, 2020 – Colombia
Macrophyes silvae Brescovit, 1992 – Peru

References

Anyphaenidae
Araneomorphae genera
Spiders of North America
Spiders of South America